The 1994–95 Alpha Ethniki was the 59th season of the highest football league of Greece. The season began on 24 September 1994 and ended on 4 June 1995. Panathinaikos won their 17th Greek title and their first one in four years.

Teams

Stadia and personnel

 1 On final match day of the season, played on 4 June 1995.

League table

Results

Top scorers

External links
Official Greek FA Site
RSSSF
Greek SuperLeague official Site
SuperLeague Statistics
 

Alpha Ethniki seasons
Greece
1